Asterix and the Big Fight (in ; in Germany as Asterix – Operation Hinkelstein) is a 1989 French animated film directed by Philippe Grimond and produced by Yannick Piel. It is the first film based on the Asterix comic series to be produced outside France being a co-production between France and Germany. Despite sharing the same title as Asterix and the Big Fight, the film shares only minor plot elements with that story, and is primarily an adaptation of Asterix and the Soothsayer. In the film, Getafix is accidentally made insane and amnesic by Obelix, forcing Asterix to try to cure him as his village is deceived by a fraudulent soothsayer that works for the Romans.

Plot summary
The Romans capture Druid Getafix, as part of their plan to deprive a rebel village of Gauls from the magic potion that gives them super-human strength. When the village attempts a rescue, Obelix accidentally hits Getafix with a menhir in the resulting chaos, causing him to be struck with amnesia and insanity. As the village comes to grip with this, a conman posing as a soothsayer named Prolix arrives and begins deceiving some of the credulous villagers into believing a number of prophecies he predicts for food and drink.

Knowing that Romans will quickly realise that the village is in trouble without the magic potion, Asterix and Vitalstatistix desperately attempt to have Getafix brew some. His concoctions quickly prove problematic, and alert a garrison of Romans into sending a spy into the village. Despite being camouflaged, he is captured and used as a guinea pig for some of Getafix's less dangerous creations. However, one of these makes him lighter than air causing him to float away, where he reports their problem. The Romans send a patrol to investigate, and come across the Soothsayer, whom they capture. Although Roman laws declare such individuals to be arrested, the garrison's centurion is convinced of Prolix's abilities and uses him to chase away the villagers.

Returning to the village, Prolix foretells doom if the village is not abandoned. Everyone leaves for a nearby island, except for Asterix, Obelix and Getafix. Shortly after the Romans move in, Getafix brews a very noxious potion whose vapors engulf the village, both restoring his memories and sanity in the process, and driving off the Romans on the belief that Prolix's prediction was true. Getafix quickly brews the magic potion and convinces the villagers to test the soothsayer's abilities by having them attack the Roman camp. In the aftermath of the attack, Prolix is hit by a menhir after his abilities are discovered to be a fake and loses his memories, while the centurion is demoted for his failure and was ordered by Optio to clean up the camp and also Prolix was ordered to leave the camp, as the village returns to normal.

Cast

Release notes
The first English dub of Asterix and the Big Fight featured Bill Oddie, Bernard Bresslaw, Peter Hawkins, Brian Blessed, Tim Brooke-Taylor, Andrew Sachs, and Ron Moody, amongst others, and was widely seen in the UK. For the UK DVD Box Set release, rather than using the British dub, an American produced dub was included, featuring the voices of Henry Winkler as Asterix, Rosey Grier as Obelix and Lucille Bliss as Bonnemine. This dub had been intended for a U.S. release which ultimately never materialized and was shelved until French distributor Gaumont acquired the rights and included it on the DVD. The American dub is considered inferior by fans of the original due to it changing parts of the script as well as character names (Getafix is changed to "Vitamix", Vitalstatistix to "Bombastix", Cacofonix to "Franksinatrix," Impedimenta to "Bonnemine" (her actual French name), and Unhygienix to "Fishstix"), and general dumbing-down for an audience assumed to be unfamiliar with the characters. The American dub assigns stereotypical Italian comedy accents to the Roman characters, features a narrator (Tony Jay) explaining the plot to the audience, and makes changes to the terminology of the original story, substituting "wizard" for druid, "fortuneteller" for soothsayer, "rockets" for menhirs, and "vitamin potion" for the magic potion.

Historical inaccuracies
The optio wears a standard legionary's helmet in the film. In his rank, his helmet would actually have had plumes of horse hair or feathers on either side of his helmet that could be accompanied by a helmet crest. He would also carry the hastile, a special staff roughly his own size.

References

External links
 Asterix and the Big Fight at Asterix NZ
 
 

1989 films
1980s French-language films
French animated films
1989 animated films
1980s French animated films
Asterix films
German animated films
West German films
French children's films
German children's films
Animated films based on comics
Films scored by Michel Colombier
Films based on multiple works of a series
1980s children's animated films
1980s German films